The Israel national under-16 basketball team is a national basketball team of Israel, administered by the Israel Basketball Association.
It represents the country in international under-16 (under age 16) basketball competitions.

FIBA Europe Under-16 Championship

See also
Israel men's national basketball team
Israel men's national under-18 basketball team
Israel women's national under-16 basketball team

References

External links
Archived records of Israel team participations

Basketball teams in Israel
Men's national under-16 basketball teams
Basketball